The 1946 KLM Douglas DC-3 Amsterdam accident was the crash of a KLM Royal Dutch Airlines flight from London to Amsterdam on 14 November 1946. The accident occurred as the Douglas DC-3 was attempting to land at Amsterdam's airport in poor weather. All 26 passengers and crew on board were killed.

Accident
The DC-3 aircraft (actually an ex-military C-47 Skytrain converted for civil use) was on a scheduled flight from London, England to Amsterdam in the Netherlands. The crew was cleared to land the aircraft at Schiphol Airport in poor weather. The first attempt to land failed and the crew had to perform a go-around. The second approach to land also failed. On the third approach to land the aircraft made a sudden turn to the left, apparently trying to line up with the runway. During this turn the Douglas DC-3 struck the ground and crashed. The aircraft caught fire on impact, killing all 21 passengers and five crew on board. The victims included Dutch novelist Herman de Man.

At the time it happened, the accident was the worst aviation accident in the history of the Netherlands. Eight days earlier another KLM DC-3 operating on the same route in the opposite direction, crashed on approach to London's Croydon Airport in poor weather. There were no fatalities in the London crash but the aircraft was written off.

References

External links
 Crash photo of PH-TBW

K
K
K
K
K